Simona Arghir-Sandu (née Arghir; 4 September 1948 – 2 September 1995) was a Romanian handballer who played for the Romania national team. She also competed in the 1976 Summer Olympics, being part of the Romanian team which finished 4th and captained it.

International honours   
World Championship:
Silver Medalist: 1973

Personal life
Her husband Mircea Sandu was a football player and president of the Romanian Football Federation between 1990 and 2014 and their daughter Raluca was a professional tennis player. They also had a son named Dan Mircea.

References

External links
Brief biography of Simona Arghir 

People from Lugoj
1948 births
1995 deaths
Romanian female handball players 
Olympic handball players of Romania
Handball players at the 1976 Summer Olympics